Sahja Railway Station is located in Sahja, union council of Tehsil Khanpur Rahim Yar Khan district of the Punjab province, Pakistan.

See also
 List of railway stations in Pakistan
 Pakistan Railways

References

External links

Railway stations in Rahim Yar Khan District
Railway stations on Karachi–Peshawar Line (ML 1)